Cepora wui is a butterfly in the family Pieridae. The butterfly is found in China (Yunnan).

References
  (2001). New species new subspecies and new record of butterflies (Lepidoptera) in China III. Entomotaxonomia 23(1): 39-46. Full article: .

Pierini
Butterflies described in 2001